The judicial branch, organized under the constitution and law, is one of five organs of power elected by the People's Congress, in the People's Republic of China.

According to the constitution, the court system is to exercise judicial power independently and free of interference from administrative organs, public organizations, and individuals. The Chinese Communist Party's Political and Legal Affairs Commissions coordinates and have direct control over all the court system.

Hong Kong and Macau have separate court systems, as mandated by the Constitution and their respective Basic Law, in accordance with the One country, two systems doctrine.

Court structure 

According to the Constitution of the People's Republic of China of 1982 and the Organic Law of the People's Courts that went into effect on January 1, 1980, the Chinese courts are divided into a four-level court system (Supreme, High, Intermediate and Primary):
 At the highest level is the Supreme People's Court (SPC) in Beijing, the premier appellate forum of the land and court of last resort, which supervises the administration of justice by all subordinate "local" and "special" people's courts. It also sets up six circuit courts seat outside of the state capital, which acts in the same capacity, to hear cross-provincial cases within respective jurisdiction.
 Local people's courts—the courts of the first instance—handle criminal and civil cases. These people's courts make up the remaining three levels of the court system and consist of "high people's courts" at the level of the provinces, autonomous regions, and special municipalities; "intermediate people's courts" at the level of prefectures, autonomous prefectures, and municipalities; and "primary people's courts" at the level of autonomous counties, towns, and municipal districts.
 Courts of Special Jurisdiction (special courts) comprises the Military Courts (military), Railway Transportion Court of China (railroad transportation) and Maritime Courts (water transportation), Internet Courts, Intellectual Property Courts and Financial Court, Except for the Military Courts, all other courts of special jurisdiction falls under the general jurisdiction of its respective high court.

Candidates for judgeship must pass the National Judicial Examination.

The court system is paralleled by a hierarchy of prosecuting offices called people's procuratorates, the highest being the Supreme People's Procuratorate.

Local departments of justice can revoke the license of lawyers, this power is used to target lawyers who challenge the authority of the state, particularly human rights lawyers.

Legal procedure
The Supreme Court is responsible for establishing and monitoring legal procedures in adherence to the laws and orders made by the legislative organs.

Following civil law traditions, the courts do not establish legally-binding precedent. The Supreme Court has the right to publish legal explanations of laws which are legally-binding but the right to interpret the constitution is reserved by the legislative organs.
A verdict made by an inferior court can be challenged in its superior court, up to the Supreme Court, there are four levels of courts in total. A superior court can also designate any of its inferior courts to hear an appeal rather than do so itself.

Civil
Besides the court system, it is also encouraged to resolve civil conflicts through a state-sponsored and -regulated mediation and arbitration system. After the first hearing of a civil case, the court is required by law to ask both parties if they are willing to resolve their conflict through a mediation, if agreed, the court should assign a mediator and oversee the process, if both parties reach an agreement, it will be legal-binding after the agreement is reviewed and documented by a judge of the court.

The enforceability of a civil verdict has long been an issue and has damaged the people's trust in the legal system. The Supreme People's Court has since then established a system to forbid debtors who fail to honor civil verdict from luxurious spending including luxurious hotel spending, flights and bullet train, though there are controversies as to if this gives the court too much authority.

Criminal
Primary level people's court can hear most criminal cases except for crimes that carries a maximum penalty of death or life imprisonment, and when involves national security and terrorism, which should be heard at an intermediate people's court at least.

History 

Between the Anti-Rightist Campaign of 1957 and the legal reforms of 1979, the courts—viewed by the leftists as troublesome and unreliable—played only a small role in the judicial system. Most of their functions were handled by other party or government organs. In 1979, however, the National People's Congress began the process of restoring the judicial system. The world was able to see an early example of this reinstituted system in action in the showcase trial of the Gang of Four and six other members of the "Lin-Jiang clique" from November 1980 to January 1981 (see the Four Modernizations). The trial, which was publicized to show that China had restored a legal system that made all citizens equal before the law, actually appeared to many foreign observers to be more a political than a legal exercise. Nevertheless, it was intended to show that China was committed to restoring a judicial system.

The Ministry of Justice, abolished in 1959, was re-established under the 1979 legal reforms to administer the newly restored judicial system. With the support of local judicial departments and bureaus, the ministry was charged with supervising personnel management, training, and funding for the courts and associated organizations and was given responsibility for overseeing legal research and exchanges with foreign judicial bodies.

The 1980 Organic Law of the People's Courts (revised in 1983) and the 1982 State Constitution established four levels of courts in the general administrative structure. Judges are elected or appointed by people's congresses at the corresponding levels to serve a maximum of two five-year terms. Most trials are administered by a collegial bench made up of one to three judges and three to five assessors. Assessors, according to the State Constitution, are elected by local residents or people's congresses from among citizens over twenty-three years of age with political rights or are appointed by the court for their expertise. Trials are conducted by the inquisitorial system, in which both judges and assessors play an active part in the questioning of all witnesses. (This contrasts with the adversarial system, in which the judge is meant to be an impartial referee between two contending attorneys.) After the judge and assessors rule on a case, they pass sentence. An aggrieved party can appeal to the next higher court.

The Organic Law of the People's Courts requires that adjudication committees be established for courts at every level. The committees usually are made up of the president, vice presidents, chief judges, and associate chief judges of the court, who are appointed and removed by the standing committees of the people's congresses at the corresponding level. The adjudication committees are charged with reviewing major cases to find errors in determination of facts or application of law and to determine if a chief judge should withdraw from a case. If a case is submitted to the adjudication committee, the court is bound by its decision. The Supreme People's Court stands at the apex of the judicial structure. Located in Beijing, it has jurisdiction over all lower and special courts, for which it serves as the ultimate appellate court. It is directly responsible to the National People's Congress Standing Committee, which elects the court president.

China also has 'special' military, rail transport, water transport, and forestry courts. These courts hear cases of counter-revolutionary activity, plundering, bribery, sabotage, or indifference to duty that result in severe damage to military facilities, work place, or government property or threaten the safety of soldiers or workers.

Military courts make up the largest group of special courts and try all treason and espionage cases. Although they are independent of civilian courts and directly subordinate to the Ministry of National Defense, military court decisions are reviewed by the Supreme People's Court. Special military courts were first established in 1954 to protect the special interests of all commanders, political commissars, and soldiers, but they ceased to function during the Cultural Revolution (1966–76). Military courts and procuratorates were reinstituted in October 1978, and open military trials resumed in December of that year.

In April 1986, at the Fourth Session of the Sixth National People's Congress, the General Principles of the Civil Code was approved as "one of China's basic laws." Consisting of more than 150 articles, the code was intended to regulate China's internal and external economic relations to establish a stable base conducive to trade and attractive to foreign investors. Many of its provisions define the legal status of economic entities and the property rights they exercise. The code clearly stipulated that private ownership of the means of production is protected by law and may not be seized or interfered with by any person or organization. It also recognizes partnerships and wholly foreign-owned or joint-venture enterprises.

In March 2011, National People's Congress enacted a revised Criminal Procedure Law which prohibited self-incrimination, allowed for the suppression of illegally obtained evidence, and ensured prompt trials for suspects. The State Council's 2012 white paper on judicial reform, unlike previous papers, does not mention the subordination of the judicial system to "the leadership of" the CCP, and replaces mentions of the Party in other places with "China".

In February 2023, the General Office of the Chinese Communist Party issued a text titled Opinions on Strengthening Legal Education and Legal Theory Research in the New Era that called for purging what it called "Western erroneous views" from legal education, including constitutional government, separation of powers, and judicial independence.

See also 

 Chinese law
 Law enforcement in the People's Republic of China
 Law of the People's Republic of China
 Legal Daily
 Legal history of China
 Legislative system of the People's Republic of China
 Ministry of Justice of the People's Republic of China

References

Citations

Sources 

 

 
Chinese law
Government of China
Penal system in China